The 1991 UEFA Women's Championship took place in Denmark. It was won by Germany in a final against Norway in a repeat of the previous edition's final. Eighteen teams entered qualifying, which was enough to make the competition the first fully official one, so the name was changed to the UEFA Women's Championship.

The tournament served as the European qualifying round for the FIFA Women's World Cup 1991.

Qualification

Squads
For a list of all squads that played in the final tournament, see 1991 UEFA Women's Championship squads

Bracket

Semifinals

Third place playoff

Final

Awards

Goalscorers
4 goals
  Heidi Mohr

1 goal

  Helle Jensen
  Sissy Raith
  Silvia Neid
  Silvia Fiorini
  Birthe Hegstad

Own goal
 Maura Furlotti (playing against Denmark)

References

Notes

External links
1989-91 UEFA Women's EURO at UEFA.com
Tables & results at RSSSF.com

1991
1991
1991 FIFA Women's World Cup qualification
1991 in women's association football
Women
1991–92 in Danish football
1991–92 in German women's football
1991–92 in Italian football
1991 in Norwegian women's football
July 1991 sports events in Europe
1991 in Danish women's sport